Coraia is a genus of skeletonizing leaf beetles in the family Chrysomelidae. There are at least four described species in Coraia. They are distributed from southern Texas to Central America.

Species
These four species belong to the genus Coraia:
 Coraia apicicornis Jacoby, 1892
 Coraia clarki Jacoby, 1886
 Coraia maculicollis H. Clark, 1865
 Coraia subcyanescens (Schaeffer, 1906)

References

Further reading

 
 
 
 

Galerucinae
Chrysomelidae genera
Articles created by Qbugbot
Taxa named by Hamlet Clark